Novoukrainka is a village in Zolotonosha Raion, Cherkasy Oblast, Ukraine. The village is north of the Dnepr River, and has a post office, a football/soccer field, and the Kovrai river runs through it. It belongs to Chornobai settlement hromada, one of the hromadas of Ukraine.

Until 18 July 2020, Novoukrainka belonged to Chornobai Raion. The raion was abolished in July 2020 as part of the administrative reform of Ukraine, which reduced the number of raions of Cherkasy Oblast to four. The area of Chornobai Raion was merged into Zolotonosha Raion.

References 

Villages in Zolotonosha Raion